Blossom Hill station is a light rail station operated by Santa Clara Valley Transportation Authority (VTA). The station is served by the Blue Line of the VTA Light Rail system. Blossom Hill station is located in the median of State Route 85, just north of Blossom Hill Road in San Jose, California. It was part of the original Guadalupe Line, the first segment of light rail from Santa Teresa to Tasman.

References

External links 

Santa Clara Valley Transportation Authority light rail stations
Santa Clara Valley Transportation Authority bus stations
Railway stations in San Jose, California
Railway stations in the United States opened in 1987
1987 establishments in California